Thomas Edward Williams (born 18 December 1957) is a Scottish former professional footballer born in Winchburgh, West Lothian, who played as a defender. He made more than 300 appearances in the English Football League playing for Leicester City, Birmingham City and Grimsby Town. During a twelve-year career with Leicester City, he helped the club to win the championship of the Football League Second Division in the 1979–80 season. After finishing his playing career he spent 24 years as a police officer in Leicestershire.

References

 
 

1957 births
Living people
People from Winchburgh
Footballers from West Lothian
Scottish footballers
Association football defenders
Leicester City F.C. players
Birmingham City F.C. players
Grimsby Town F.C. players
English Football League players